The consensus 1977 College Basketball All-American team, as determined by aggregating the results of four major All-American teams.  To earn "consensus" status, a player must win honors from a majority of the following teams: the Associated Press, the USBWA, The United Press International and the National Association of Basketball Coaches.

1977 Consensus All-America team

Individual All-America teams

AP Honorable Mention:

 Greg Ballard, Oregon
 Larry Bird, Indiana State
 Winford Boynes, San Francisco
 Skip Brown, Wake Forest
 Kenny Carr, NC State
 Wesley Cox, Louisville
 Brad Davis, Maryland
 Walter Davis, North Carolina
 Marvin Delph, Arkansas
 T. R. Dunn, Alabama
 Bob Elliott, Arizona
 Mike Evans, Kansas State
 Jack Givens, Kentucky
 Mike Glenn, Southern Illinois
 Steve Grant, Manhattan
 David Greenwood, UCLA
 Tony Hanson, Connecticut
 James Hardy, San Francisco
 Joe Hassett, Providence
 Don Henderson, Arkansas State
 Matt Hicks, Northern Illinois
 John Irving, Hofstra
 Eddie Johnson, Auburn
 Jeff Jonas, Utah
 Reggie King, Alabama
 Tom LaGarde, North Carolina
 Rich Laurel, Hofstra
 Cedric Maxwell, UNC Charlotte
 Glenn Mosley, Seton Hall
 Calvin Natt, Northeast Louisiana
 Eddie Owens, UNLV
 Bruce Parkinson, Purdue
 Ron Perry, Holy Cross
 Anthony Roberts, Oral Roberts
 Rick Robey, Kentucky
 Steve Sheppard, Maryland
 Andrew Toney, Southwestern Louisiana
 Wilson Washington, Old Dominion
 Glen Williams, St. John's
 Ray Williams, Minnesota
 Gary Winton, Army

See also
 1976–77 NCAA Division I men's basketball season

References

NCAA Men's Basketball All-Americans
All-Americans